Paul Neeckx was a Belgian swimmer. He competed in the men's 200 metre breaststroke event at the 1920 Summer Olympics.

References

External links
 

Year of birth missing
Year of death missing
Olympic swimmers of Belgium
Swimmers at the 1920 Summer Olympics
Place of birth missing
Belgian male breaststroke swimmers